Fort Schlosser was a fortification built in Western New York in the United States around 1760 by British Colonial forces, in order to guard the upper entrance to the portage around Niagara Falls, north of Porter-Barton Dock or Schlosser's Landing along the shoreline with the Niagara River. 

The fort was named for its first commander, Captain Joseph Schlosser of the Royal American Regiment of Foot, a practice that was common in the British Army.

Facilities
The fort consisted of a wood stockade with several structures within:
 2 storehouses
 Living Quarters for Officers and Soldiers

Four cannons provided protection for the fort.

Replacement
The fort replaced Fort Petite Niagara or Fort du Portage, a small fortification built by the French (Daniel-Marie Chabert de Joncaire) which was burned by the retreating French prior to the Siege of Fort Niagara in 1759. The Old Stone Chimney from Fort Little Niagara was incorporated into Fort Schlosser. Fort Grey guarded the end of the portage in Lewiston, NY. Fort Niagara guards the mouth of the Niagara where it flows into Lake Ontario.

Fort Schlosser was occupied by American troops at the start of the War of 1812, but was captured in 1813 and burned.  The fort was located in present-day Niagara Falls, New York in what is now Niagara County, New York, near the current water intakes for the New York Power Authority off of the Robert Moses Parkway.  Today, all that remains is the Old Stone Chimney, which was moved to near the intersection of Buffalo Avenue and the Robert Moses Parkway traffic circle.

See also
 Fort Niagara

References

External links 
  Brief history of Fort Schlosser
 https://www.oldfortniagara.org

Schlosser
Schlosser
Buildings and structures in Niagara Falls, New York
Schlosser
Niagara River
Schlosser
Schlosser